Sharaf ol Din (also Romanized as Sharaf ol Dīn; also known as Sharaf od Dīn) is a village in Kahnuk Rural District, Irandegan District, Khash County, Sistan and Baluchestan Province, Iran. At the 2006 census, its population was 31, in 5 families.

References 

Populated places in Khash County